Certain members of the unrelated snout moths (Pyralidae) are also known as "ermine moths." Spilosoma lubricipeda is an unrelated moth with the common name "white ermine."

The family Yponomeutidae are known as the ermine moths, with several hundred species, most of them in the tropics. The larvae tend to form communal webs, and some are minor pests in agriculture, forestry, and horticulture. Some of the adults are very attractive. Adult moths are minor pollinators.

There are five or six subfamilies. Some authors also include the closely related Plutellidae as yet another subfamily:

Subfamilies
 Saridoscelinae
 Yponomeutinae

The following genera do not have assigned subfamilies available:

 Abacistis
 Acrataula
 Aemylurgis
 Aictis
 Amalthina
 Anaphantis
 Argyresthites
 Artenacia
 Balanoptica
 Betharga
 Buxeta
 Calamotis
 Callithrinca
 Caminophantis
 Chionaemopsis
 Citrinarchis
 Conchiophora
 Coptoproctis
 Cymonympha
 Dascia
 Diaphragmistis
 Entrichiria
 Epactosaris
 Epichthonodes
 Eriopyrrha
 Euarne
 Exanthica
 Exaulistis
 Hesperarcha
 Hierodryas
 Ilychytis
 Iriania
 Iridostoma
 Isotornis
 Ithutomus
 Metanomeuta
 Metharmostis
 Mnemoses
 Mychonoa
 Nematobola
 Nosymna
 Orencostoma
 Oridryas
 Orinympha
 Orthosaris
 Palaetheta
 Parazelota
 Parexaula
 Pauridioneura
 Phasmatographa
 Piestoceros
 Podiasa
 Porphyrocrates
 Pronomeuta
 Protonoma
 Pseudorinympha
 Thyridectis
 Toiana
 Trisophista
 Typhogenes

Characteristics

The heads mostly have smooth scales, the haustellum is naked and the labial palps are curved upwards. The maxillary palps usually consist of one or two segments. The wings are long, often with fringes on the trailing edges of the hindwings. The colour is usually white, pale grey or drab, often with many dark speckles.

Adult ermine moths are mostly nocturnal.

The larvae are leaf-webbers, leaf skeletonizers, leafminers or needleminers and are found on a variety of host plants. Some cause economic damage to crops and trees.

Species (selection)
Better-known species include:
 Spindle ermine, Yponomeuta cagnagella
 Bird-cherry ermine, Yponomeuta evonymella
 Orchard ermine, Yponomeuta padella
 Yponomeuta plumbella
 Acmosara polyxena
 Apple ermine Yponomeuta malinellus
 Ailanthus webworm

Etymology 

The word Yponomeutidae comes from the Ancient Greek  meaning under and  meaning food or dwelling, thus "feeding secretly, or burrow".

References

External links 

 

 
Moths of Australia